LBV may refer to:

 Late bottled vintage, a type of Port wine
 Luminous blue variable, a very bright, blue, hypergiant variable star
 Libreville International Airport (IATA: LBV), in Libreville, Gabon
 Load bearing vest, an individual integrated fighting system
 A World War 2 type craft; see 
 A clothing brand founded by Joss Sackler